Uzi Cohen (1 May 1952 – 18 January 2008) was an Israeli Likud activist and politician.

Early life
Born in moshav Tal Shahar, he moved with his family to Ra'anana at the age of two. He joined the Likud at age 16.

Political career
In 1990, Cohen became the deputy mayor of Ra'anana under mayor Ze'ev Bielski. After Bielski was appointed head of the Jewish Agency, Cohen became interim mayor of the city until elections were held. Cohen lost, and once again he served as deputy mayor.

Cohen was a well known public figure in Israel, due to his work with the Likud and his larger than life persona. He would often quoted in the media and boasted of his ability to "arrange jobs" for friends and acquaintances through his position within the Likud party.

He also championed the building of a canal that, according to him, would turn Ra'anana into "the Venice of the Middle East." Cohen is also famous for being spoofed on Eretz Nehederet, a prime-time satirical television show on Channel 2 Television.

Death
Cohen died of an apparent heart attack on 18 January 2008, aged 55.

References
Uzi Cohen, renowned Likud activist, dies aged 55 Haaretz

1952 births
2008 deaths
Deputy mayors of places in Israel
Israeli activists
Israeli Jews
Likud politicians
Mayors of Ra'anana